Government Annuities Act is a stock short title used in New Zealand and the United Kingdom for legislation relating to government annuities.

List

New Zealand
The Government Annuities Act 1869 (No 60)

United Kingdom
The Government Annuities Act 1830 (11 Geo 4 & 1 Will 4 c 26)
The Government Annuities Act 1838 (1 & 2 Vict c 51)
The Government Annuities (Investments) Act 1864 (27 & 28 Vict c 46)
The Government Annuities Act 1929 (19 & 20 Geo 5 c 29)

The Government Annuities Acts 1829 to 1888 is the collective title of the following Acts:
The Government Annuities Act 1829 (10 Geo 4 c 24)
The Government Annuities Act 1832 (2 & 3 Will 4 c 59)
The Government Annuities Act 1833 (3 & 4 Will 4 c 24)
The Government Annuities Act 1853 (16 & 17 Vict c 45)
The Government Annuities Act 1864 (27 & 28 Vict c 43)
The Government Annuities Act 1873 (36 & 37 Vict c 44)
The Government Annuities Act 1882 (45 & 46 Vict c 51)
Parts II and III of the Savings Banks Act 1887 (50 & 51 Vict c 40)
The National Debt (Supplemental) Act 1888 (51 & 52 Vict c 15)

See also
List of short titles

References

Lists of legislation by short title and collective title
Annuities